The 2009 Grand Prix was a professional ranking tournament that took place between 3–11 October 2009 at the Kelvin Hall in Glasgow, Scotland.

Neil Robertson won in the final 9–4 against Ding Junhui.

Prize fund
The breakdown of prize money for this year is shown below:

Winner: £75,000
Runner-up: £35,000
Semi-finals: £20,000
Quarter-finals: £12,000
Last 16: £9,550
Last 32: £7,100
Last 48: £4,650
Last 64: £2,200

Stage one highest break: £500
Stage two highest break: £4,000
Stage one maximum break: £1,000
Stage two maximum break: £20,000

Main draw
The draw for round one was made on the evening of 24 September 2009 at Pontins in Prestatyn and was streamed live by 110sport.com. The draw from round two up to and including the semi-finals was made on a random basis.

The order of play and table numbers for all matches up to the semi-finals was determined once the draw for that round was made and published by the Tournament Director.

All matches up to and including the quarter-finals were best of 9 frames, the semi-finals were best of 11 frames and the final was the best of 17 frames. (Seedings in parentheses, all times are BST.)

Last 32

 Saturday, 3 October – 13:00
  John Higgins (1)  5–1  Mark Joyce
  Marco Fu (8) 4–5  Mark Davis Saturday, 3 October – 19:00
  Mark Selby (7) 3–5  Ken Doherty
  Joe Perry (12) 5–2  Marcus Campbell
 Sunday, 4 October – 12:30
  Ali Carter (5) 1–5  Robert Milkins  Ding Junhui (13) 5–4  Matthew Stevens
 Sunday, 4 October – 19:00
  Ryan Day (6) 3–5  Jamie Cope
  Neil Robertson (9) 5–3  Gerard Greene

 Monday, 5 October – 13:30
  Stephen Hendry (10) 5–2  Matthew Selt
  Peter Ebdon (14) 5–2  Liang Wenbo
 Monday, 5 October – 19:00
  Shaun Murphy (4) 4–5  Barry Pinches
  Mark Allen (11) 5–3  Ian McCulloch
 Tuesday, 6 October – 13:30
  Ronnie O'Sullivan (2) 5–3  Jamie Burnett
  Mark Williams (15) 5–0  Stuart Bingham
 Tuesday, 6 October – 19:00
  Stephen Maguire (3) 5–3  Nigel Bond
  Mark King (16) 5–4  Ricky Walden

Last 16

 Wednesday, 7 October – 14:00
  Ronnie O'Sullivan (2) 4–5  John Higgins (1)
  Jamie Cope 3–5  Mark Allen (11)
 Wednesday, 7 October – 19:00
  Neil Robertson (9) 5–2  Ken Doherty
  Joe Perry (12) 5–2  Barry Pinches

 Thursday, 8 October – 13:30
  Mark Williams (15) 5–2  Stephen Hendry (10)
  Peter Ebdon (14) 5–3  Mark Davis
 Thursday, 8 October – 19:00
  Stephen Maguire (3) 1–5  Ding Junhui (13)
  Robert Milkins 5–1  Mark King (16)

Quarter-finals

 Friday, 9 October – 13:30
  John Higgins (1) 5–1  Mark Allen (11)
  Joe Perry (12) 1–5  Neil Robertson (9)

 Friday, 9 October – 19:00
  Peter Ebdon (14) 2–5  Ding Junhui (13)
  Mark Williams (15) 5–2  Robert Milkins

Semi-finals

 Saturday, 10 October – 13:00
  John Higgins (1) 5–6  Neil Robertson (9)

 Saturday, 10 October – 19:30
  Mark Williams (15) 1–6  Ding Junhui (13)

Final

Qualifying
These matches took place from 21 to 24 September 2009 at Pontins in Prestatyn, Wales.

Century breaks

Televised stage centuries

 142  Mark Williams
 135  John Higgins
 135  Peter Ebdon
 134  Ryan Day
 131, 126  Ronnie O'Sullivan
 130, 128, 124, 114, 108, 103, 100  Neil Robertson

 116  Stephen Hendry
 112, 107, 105, 103  Ding Junhui
 109  Barry Pinches
 105  Ken Doherty
 104  Marcus Campbell

Qualifying stage centuries

 140  Atthasit Mahitthi
 137  Joe Jogia
 135  Marcus Campbell
 129, 115, 107  David Gilbert
 125  Tom Ford
 123, 117  Liang Wenbo
 123  Matthew Selt
 116  Michael Judge
 115  Adrian Gunnell

 113  Fergal O'Brien
 109  Jamie Cope
 106  Martin Gould
 106  Mark Davis
 104  Bjorn Haneveer
 103  Simon Bedford
 102  Daniel Wells
 101  Robert Milkins
 100  Jamie Burnett

References

World Open (snooker)
Grand Prix
Grand Prix (snooker)
Snooker competitions in Scotland